The Ravensberg is a 659 m high mountain in the South Harz mountains in the German state of Lower Saxony. It is relatively isolated and visible for a long way. It lies in the district of Göttingen, north of Bad Sachsa.

The mountain top is crowned with a prominent 64 m high tower, which was built in 1970. This tower acted as a listening post during the Cold War; today it is used by Deutsche Telekom.

The Ravensberg is a wonderful viewing point, and is also very easy to get to by car, a road about 3.5 km long, running up to the summit from Bad Sachsa.  There is an old boundary stone, the Dreiherrenstein, on this road shortly before the summit. Until 1866 this was where the borders of the Kingdom of Prussia, Kingdom of Hanover and Duchy of  Brunswick met. Today the Dreiherrenstein is the starting point for several walks, mountain bike routes and the South Harz cross-country skiing trail, that runs, for example, to the Stöberhai mountain and town of Braunlage. On the summit is a restaurant catering for day-trippers. There is also a skiing area with several downhill runs and 3 lifts.

Gallery

See also
 List of mountains and hills in Lower Saxony

External links 

  Ravensberg (Bad Sachsa) listening post

Mountains of Lower Saxony
Mountains of the Harz
Mountains under 1000 metres